Sebastián Alejandro Roco Melgarejo (born 26 June 1983) is a Chilean former footballer who played as a centre back.

Career
Roco began his football career aged 17 at the professional club of his city, Unión San Felipe of Chile's first division. In January 2003, he moved to Santiago Wanderers of Valparaíso, in where he was consecrated as centre back, scored 12 goals in 95 appearances and being many times in the nominations of the Chile national football team, but the end of this was when he was marginated of the team on 14 November 2007.

However, despite of his bad moment, in January 2008, his rights was acquired by the Mexican club Necaxa, being immediately loaned to Audax Italiano for play the Copa Libertadores of that year. After a regular season in the club of La Florida, he moved to the Argentine Primera División club Gimnasia de Jujuy for an undisclosed fee. Roco made his debut in a 4–0 away loss against Boca Juniors at La Bombonera, playing the full 90 minutes. On 1 July 2009, was confirmed his return to the Chilean football, because Everton signed him for the Clausura Tournament of that season.

The next season, was signed by Cobreloa, in where he was one of the key players of the runner-up earned in the 2011 Clausura Tournament lost against Universidad de Chile that in the season achieved the treble after of defeat to Cobreloa. On 2 March 2012, was reported that Flamengo would be interested in the services of the centre back.

Roco played internationally against the Chile national football team in the 2007 Copa América in Venezuela, being call-up in that occasion by Nelson Acosta. He has played six times and scored one goal for the national team in his first match with Chile on 25 April 2006, in a 4–1 win over New Zealand on 24 April 2006.

International goals

Personal life
Roco belongs to a football family from San Felipe since both his father, Marcial, and his son, Bastián, played for Unión San Felipe. In addition, the cousin of Marcial, Héctor Roco Lucero, is a historical player of Unión San Felipe and was the assistant coach of his son, Héctor Roco Leiva, from 2020 to 2021.

Honours

Club
Cobreloa
 Primera División de Chile (1): Runner-up 2011 Clausura

Universidad de Concepción
 Copa Chile (1): 2014–15

References

External links
 Roco at Football Lineups
 Argentine Primera statistics at Fútbol XXI 

1983 births
Living people
People from San Felipe, Chile
Chilean footballers
Chile international footballers
Chilean expatriate footballers
Unión San Felipe footballers
Santiago Wanderers footballers
Deportes Temuco footballers
Club Necaxa footballers
Audax Italiano footballers
Gimnasia y Esgrima de Jujuy footballers
Everton de Viña del Mar footballers
Cobreloa footballers
Universidad de Concepción footballers
Deportes Melipilla footballers
Primera B de Chile players
Chilean Primera División players
Argentine Primera División players
Chilean expatriate sportspeople in Mexico
Chilean expatriate sportspeople in Argentina
Expatriate footballers in Argentina
Expatriate footballers in Mexico
2007 Copa América players
Association football defenders